

List

By-elections

1987
5 March: Midlands West - John Bird (Lab), replacing Terry Pitt who died 3 October 1986

1988
15 December: Hampshire Central - Edward Kellett-Bowman (Con), replacing Basil de Ferranti who died 24 September 1988

Change of Group
 John Taylor (UUP) left the European Democrats on 20 January 1987 and joined the European Right group.

References 

1984
List
United Kingdom